Severn Sea  may refer to:
 the Bristol Channel
 a rosemary cultivar